Lt. Colonel Lewis Lee Hawkins (8 August 1930 – 2 June 1973) was a United States military aide to Iran who was assassinated. Vahid Afrakhteh, a founding member of Peykar, was captured and confessed to the assassination. Many sources attributed this assassination to the People's Mujahedin of Iran.

Early life 
Hawkins was born to Herman and Mary Hawkins in Chicago on 8 August 1930. He graduated from Plymouth High School and enlisted in South Carolina Presbyterian college on a basketball scholarship. He graduated in 1952 and joined the United States Army as a second Lieutenant. Hawkins later obtained a master's degree in Business Administration from Syracuse University.

In the 1970s Hawkins became the Director of the Department of Finance at U.S. Army Finance School at Indiana. In 1972 Hawkins was assigned to be the deputy chief in U.S. Military Assistance Advisory Group to the Imperial Iranian Armed Forces in Iran. He lived with his wife and children in the Abbasabad district.

Assassination 
On June 2, 1973 Hawkins was walking to the street corner to be picked up by his driver when two terrorists riding on a motorcycle shot him at point blank range, killing him instantly.  Hawkins' wife rushed outside to see his body in a pool of blood. The terrorists immediately fled the scene and were not captured.

According to an American military advisor, Hawkins was killed "by an Iranian terrorist". The assassination seemed to have been motivated by political considerations. Although there were two witnesses, assassins were wearing motorcycle helmets and could not be identified. Some GOI officials believed the group responsible to be left-wing and Iraq-supported, while others suspected Mujahedin-e-Khalq.

On May 11, 1976, the Washington Post reported that in January of that year, "nine terrorists convicted of murdering the three American colonels… were executed. The leader of the group, Vahid Afrakhteh, one of the founders of Peykar (Marxist group that broke off from Mujahedin-e-Khalq) stated that he personally killed col. Lewis Lee Hawkins in Tehran in 1973. The 2006 US State Department report blamed "a Marxist element of the MEK" for killing American security advisers in Iran in the 1970s, however, the 2007 report blamed these killings on the MEK itself. The State Department reports in 2010 and 2011 reported that the MEK assassinated Hawkins.

Nevertheless, some sources have said the People's Mujahedin of Iran (MEK) was responsible.

See also
Paul R. Shaffer

References

1930 births
1973 deaths
United States Army officers
Assassinated American people
American military personnel killed in action
People murdered in Iran
American expatriates in Iran